Pterodactyl is an informal term for pterosaurs, based on the genus of the first pterosaur known to science, Pterodactylus antiquus.

Pterodactyl may also refer to:
Pterodactyl (film), a horror film
Westland-Hill Pterodactyl, a series of experimental aircraft designs starting in the 1920s
Chengdu Pterodactyl I, an unmanned aerial vehicle developed in the People's Republic of China
Pterodactyl Ascender, a family of ultralight aircraft that were sold in kit form between 1979 and 1984

See also
 Pterodactylid, a pterosaur of the family Pterodactylidae
 Pterodactyloid, a pterosaur of the suborder Pterodactyloidea
 Pterosaur, an archosaur of the order Pterosauria
 Pteranodon, a pterosaur often used as a basis for common depictions of "pterodactyls" in popular media